Copley is a crater on Mercury. It has a diameter of 34 kilometers. Its name was adopted by the International Astronomical Union (IAU) in 1976. Copley is named for the American painter John Singleton Copley, who lived from 1738 to 1815.

References

Impact craters on Mercury